Sandro Sambugaro (born 6 July 1965) is an Italian ski jumper. He competed at the 1984 Winter Olympics and the 1988 Winter Olympics.

References

External links
 

1965 births
Living people
Italian male ski jumpers
Olympic ski jumpers of Italy
Ski jumpers at the 1984 Winter Olympics
Ski jumpers at the 1988 Winter Olympics
People from Asiago
Sportspeople from the Province of Vicenza